Max Bruch's Violin Concerto No. 3 in D minor, Op. 58, was composed in 1891 and dedicated to the violinist/composer Joseph Joachim, who had persuaded him to expand a single movement concert piece into a full violin concerto.

It has never attained the same prominence as the G minor concerto.

Description
In 1891 Bruch composed his Violin Concerto No. 3 in D minor, Op. 58, which was dedicated to his friend (and superior at the Berlin Academy of Music) the violinist/composer Joseph Joachim, who had persuaded him to expand what had started out as a single movement concert piece into a full violin concerto. Joachim was the soloist at the work's premiere, in Dusseldorf in 31 May 1891.

Despite being advocated by Joachim and Pablo de Sarasate, the concerto, which differed from its predecessors in its adherence to traditional classical structures, never attained the same prominence as the G minor concerto.

In recent years the concerto has been described as "...a musical unicorn: since it has almost never been played, its existence is for many the stuff only of musicological folklore." Program notes for a 2013 performance of the G minor concerto by the Atlanta Symphony Orchestra even denied the existence of the concerto, stating that Bruch had composed only two violin concertos, the G minor concerto and the D minor concerto composed for Sarasate.

Structure

The concerto has three movements:

A typical performance lasts around 38 minutes.

References
Notes

Sources

External links
 
 
 
 
 
 

Concertos by Max Bruch
Bruch 03
1891 compositions
Compositions in D minor